Margit Evelyn Newton (born Margit Gansbacher in 1962) is an Italian actress who appeared in fourteen films between 1979 and 1990. Newton is perhaps best known for her performance in the 1980 zombie film Hell of the Living Dead (also known as Zombie Creeping Flesh).

Newton used the name Margie Moreau in her first two films, 1979's La Vedova del trullo and 1980's The Iron Hand of the Mafia.  She also appeared in The Last Hunter (1980, also known as L'Ultimo cacciatore and Hunter of the Apocalypse), billed as Margi Eveline Newton, and in The Final Executioner (1984) and The Bronx Executioner (1989), billed as Margie Newton. She had a cameo appearance in Claude Chabrol's Quiet Days in Clichy (1990), her most recent film to date. In addition to her acting work, Newton also modeled in the Italian men's magazines Playmen and Ginfilm between 1984 and 1987. She retired from show business in the 1990s to marry and raise a family.

Filmography
La Vedova del trullo (1979)
The Iron Hand of the Mafia (1980)
Hell of the Living Dead (1980)
The Last Hunter (1980)
The Final Executioner (1984)
The Adventures of Hercules (1985)
The Bronx Executioner (1989)
Act of Revenge (1989)
I Won the New Year's Lottery (1989)
Quiet Days in Clichy (1990)

References

External links

MySpace Tribute Site

Italian female models
Italian film actresses
Actors from Bolzano
Living people
1961 births